Claudia Testoni (19 December 1915 – 17 July 1998), was an Italian hurdler, sprinter and long jumper. She was European champion, in 1938, on 80 metres hurdles. She was born in Bologna and died in Cagliari.

Biography
Testoni is one of the 38 athletes included in the FIDAL Hall of Fame (list of Italian athletes who have won at least one gold medal at the Olympic Games, World Championships or European Championships, or who have achieved a world record).

She was 4th at the 1936 Summer Olympics in two events. From 1931 to 1940 she has 17 caps in the Italian national athletics team. In the 1930s was celebrated her rivalry with compatriot Ondina Valla (the winner in Berlin 1936), after a thrilling final, resolved by a photo finish, and the same place in the 4 × 100 m relay. It is said that the disappointment over the Olympic fourth place was so great, that from that moment on she turned her back to her friend and rival Ondina; other sources, however, report letters in which the two friends showed renewed demonstrations of affection.

She was the world record holder in the 80 m hurdles event, until in 1942 it was taken away by Fanny Blankers-Koen. Her son-in-law, Claudio Velluti, was a professional basketball player of Olimpia Milano.

World record
80 metres hurdles: 11.3 ( Garmisch-Partenkirchen, 23 July 1939)
80 metres hurdles: 11.3 ( Dresden, 13 August 1939)

Personal best
100 metres: 12"09 (1939)
80 metres hurdles: 11"3 (1939)

Achievements

National titles
Claudia Testoni has won the Italian Athletics Championships 19 times in various specialties.
1 win in 60 metres (1933)
1 win in 80 metres (1932)
3 wins in  100 metres (1932, 1937, 1940)
2 wins in  200 metres (1933, 1934)
5 wins in  80 metres hurdles (1935, 1936, 1938, 1939, 1940)

See also
 Women's 80 metres hurdles world record progression
 Italian record progression women's long jump
 Testoni–Valla rivalry
 FIDAL Hall of Fame

References

External links
 
 Claudia Testoni at Track and Field Statistics

1915 births
1998 deaths
Italian female hurdlers
Italian female sprinters
Italian female high jumpers
Italian female long jumpers
Italian female shot putters
Sportspeople from Bologna
Olympic athletes of Italy
Athletes (track and field) at the 1936 Summer Olympics
European Athletics Championships medalists
Italian Athletics Championships winners
20th-century Italian women